The 2015 La Manga Cup is an exhibition international club football (soccer) competition featuring football club teams from Europe, which was held in February and March 2015. All matches were played in La Manga Stadium in La Manga Club, Spain. This was the eighteenth La Manga Cup.

Teams 
The following 32 clubs participated in the 2015 tournament:

  Vålerenga Fotball
  AGF Aarhus
  Viking FK
  Tromsø IL
  IK Start
  Aalesunds FK
  Sarpsborg 08 FF
  Sogndal Fotball
  SK Brann
  Sandefjord Fotball
  Sandnes Ulf
  Fredrikstad FK
  Ranheim Fotball
  Mjøndalen IF
  IL Hødd
  Hønefoss BK
  Bærum SK
  Strømmen IF
  Åsane Fotball
  FK Jerv
  Bryne FK
  Levanger FK
  Kristiansund BK
  Stabæk Fotball
  Nest-Sotra Fotball
  Follo FK
  LMC
  LMC 1
  LMC 2
  LMC 3

Standings

Group 1

Matches

References 

La Manga Cup
2015